Good Morning Sports Fans is a breakfast television show focussing on sports news and features, broadcast on Sky Sports News every day between 7am and 10am. It has been a regular feature on the channel since it launched in August 1998. Regular presenters on the slot include Mike Wedderburn, Alex Hammond, John Davies, Olivia Wayne, Rachel Wyse, Millie Clode and Chloe Everton.

The programme's format is now the same as for the rest of Sky Sports News output. However previous years saw the programme broadcast show-specific features, such as a sports-focused weather forecast (presented by the Sky News Weather team), a Surfing Report, Alex Hammond's Tip Of The Day, and the sports stories in the day's newspapers.

In August 2010, the show relaunched with a new look and in high-definition alongside the launch of Sky Sports News HD. The show was revamped in August 2011 with a new set and presenting lineup, including the return of Kirsty Gallacher.

Past theme music has included "Surface To Air" by The Chemical Brothers, and a version of Lux Aeterna.

References 

Sky Sports
Sports television in the United Kingdom
1998 British television series debuts
1990s British sports television series
2000s British sports television series
2010s British sports television series
2020s British sports television series
Breakfast television in the United Kingdom